Seven Seas Marine Life Park was a marine mammal park, and animal theme park built and owned by the city of Arlington, Texas, United States. 

The park opened on March 18, 1972. The  site was located in north Arlington off Interstate 30 near Six Flags Over Texas and adjacent to Arlington Stadium.

The park lost almost half a million dollars in 1972, 1973 and 1974 and after the 1975 season the animals were sold. The park reopened for the 1976 season as Hawaii Kai. The attendance for that season was at an all-time low and the city council of Arlington voted to close the park because it did not generate enough revenue to both pay its operating expenses and pay off the bonded indebtedness.

The property is now the site of the Arlington Sheraton Hotel and has several buildings on the property that date back to the park. In addition, there is a remaining piece from the Japan garden, a very nice, large bridged Pagoda still exists outside the hotels court pool area.

Sections

Arctic Ocean
Caribbean Sea
Indian Ocean
Mediterranean Sea
Sea of Cortez
Sea of Japan
South Seas

Notable Animals

Newtka (also spelled Nootka) the killer whale: A 6,000 lb. and 18 ft. female orca that resided in the park's largest animal performance stadium. This arena went by many names including Indian Ocean Pool, Killer Whale Stadium, and 7-eleven Killer Whale Stadium. Trained by Larry Lawrence, Newtka lived in the park during all four years of operation and was considered the main attraction. After the 1975 season she was sold for $125,000 to Marineland and Game Farm Canada, joining their current orca Kandu.

Dolphin Show: Jannie, Rodney, Debbie are three of the twelve bottle-nosed dolphins resided at the park during its four years of operation. They all averaged about seven feet long and lived in the Mediterranean Sea Stadium. Their shows changed from season to season, but their most notable act was the Dolphin University Show.
 
Pancho the Elephant Seal: The 2,500 pound male was known as a crowd pleaser. He was so popular that he received five write-in votes during the 1973 mayoral race against Mayor Vandergriff, who was also very fond of the sea mammal. Even with his popularity, his show tended to come and go due to his temperamental nature. The show only went on if he was in the mood. There was at one point another (younger) elephant seal named Cisco that would stand in for Pancho.

Sea-lion Circus: Over fourteen Californian sea lions lived and performed within the park, rotating between the shows and the feeding pools.

Penguin Troop: It was originally planned for these birds to learn how to roller skate, but this dream never seemed to come to pass. This, however, didn't deter the public from coming to see these small birds perform in the "Sea of Cortez Arena" with their trainers. Many of the birds were Rockhopper Penguins with the exception of one Magellanic Penguin.

Other animals that resided in the park also include a chimpanzee, three harbor seals, otters, a rescued caiman croc, two Himalayan black bears, at least seven sharks, a sea turtle named Tom, flamingos, macaws, toucans, ducks, geese, and thousands of koi and goldfish.

Rides and attractions
Arctic Ride - Dark Ride through Antarctica
Beacon of the Seven Seas
Bona Venture
Koi Fish Pond
Pearl Diving

References

External links
Seven Seas park map 1973

1972 establishments in Texas
Amusement parks in Texas
Defunct amusement parks in Texas
Oceanaria in the United States
Aquaria in Texas
Buildings and structures in Tarrant County, Texas
1976 disestablishments in Texas